The administrative divisions of Tanzania are controlled by Part I, Article 2.2 of the Constitution of Tanzania. Tanzania is divided into thirty-one regions (mkoa in Swahili). Each region is subdivided into districts (wilaya in Swahili). The districts are sub-divided into divisions (tarafa in Swahili) and further into local wards (kata in Swahili). Wards are further subdivided for management purposes: for urban wards into streets (mtaa in Swahili) and for rural wards into  villages (kijiji in Swahili). The villages may be further subdivided into hamlets (kitongoji in Swahili).

Regions

In 1922 under the British Tanganyika was divided into twenty-two regions, known as "divisions": Arusha, Bagamoyo, Bukoba, Dar es Salaam, Dodoma, Iringa, Kilwa, Kondoa-Irangi, Lindi, Mahenge, Morogoro, Moshi, Mwanza, Pangani, Rufiji, Rungwe, Songea, Tabora, Tanga, Ufipa, Ujiji, and Usambara.

Districts

According to the 2012 Tanzania National Census, Tanzania was divided into 169 districts. There is one type of rural district: a District Council. And there are three types of urban districts: Town Council, Municipal Council and City Council.

Divisions
A division is an administrative organization for several Wards.

Wards
A village is the lowest government administrative structure at the community level. In an urban area, a cluster (mtaa) can include a number of streets. A Ward (Kata) is an administrative structure for one single town or portion of a bigger town (Urban Wards). Rural wards are composed of several villages.

Notes

 
Tanzania
Tanzania